Avatar is a novel by John Passarella set in the fictional universe of the U.S. television series Angel.

Plot summary

Cordelia suggests beginning a Web site for their detective agency, but Angel is hesitant—as Doyle points out, "people in trouble want to interface with a face." Meanwhile, the police discover a trail of corpses across the city. The only connection between these victims (apart from the cause of death) is their hobby of online chatting. It seems a techno-savvy demon must be on the prowl, hoping to complete a ritual going even beyond a World Wide Web.

Continuity

Supposed to be set early in Angel season 1, before the episode "Hero".
Cordy mentioned that she only became part of the Scooby Gang because of her relationship with Xander.
Characters include Angel, Cordelia, Doyle and Kate Lockley.

Canonical issues

Angel books such as this one are not usually considered by fans as canonical. Some fans consider them stories from the imaginations of authors and artists, while other fans consider them as taking place in an alternative fictional reality. However unlike fan fiction, overviews summarising their story, written early in the writing process, were 'approved' by both Fox and Joss Whedon (or his office), and the books were therefore later published as officially Buffy/Angel merchandise.

External links

Reviews
Litefoot1969.bravepages.com - Review of this book by Litefoot
Teen-books.com - Reviews of this book
Shadowcat.name - Review of this book

Angel (1999 TV series) novels
2001 fantasy novels